Wenchangge station is a subway station in Kaifu District, Changsha, Hunan, China, operated by the Changsha subway operator Changsha Metro. It entered revenue service on June 28, 2016. It later became an interchange on June 28, 2022 after the opening of Line 6.

History 
The station opened on 28 June 2016.

Layout

Surrounding area
Entrance No. 1: Sanjiaotang School
Entrance No. 3: South Campus of Changsha University, Changsha No. 8 High School
Entrance No. 4: Site of Liu Tingfang Mansion

References

Railway stations in Hunan
Railway stations in China opened in 2016